is a Japanese astronomer.

He has discovered a number of asteroids, including 5881 Akashi (with T. Nomura), 6559 Nomura (with K. Kawanishi), and 8892 Kakogawa (with T. Nomura). He was also a co-discoverer of Comet Sugano-Saigusa-Fujikawa (C/1983 J1).

The asteroid 5872 Sugano is named after him. Asteroid 6155 Yokosugano was named for his wife, Yoko.

A long-time employee of Akashi Municipal Planetarium in Akashi, Hyōgo, Sugano worked to develop amateur astronomy in Japan.

References

20th-century Japanese astronomers
Discoverers of asteroids
Living people
Year of birth missing (living people)